This is a list of Iranian football transfers for the 2011–12 winter transfer window. Only moves featuring at least one Iran Pro League or Azadegan League club are listed.

Iran Pro League

Damash Gilan 

In:

Out:

Esteghlal 

In:

Out:

Fajr Sepasi 

In:

Out:

Foolad 

In:

Out:

Malavan 

In:

Out:

Mes Kerman 

In:

Out:

Mes Sarcheshmeh 

In:

Out:

Naft Tehran 

In:

Out:

Persepolis 

In:

Out:

Rah Ahan 

In:

Out:

Saba Qom 

In:

Out:

Saipa 

In:

Out:

Sanat Naft 

In:

Out:

Sepahan 

In:

Out:

Shahin Bushehr 

In:

Out:

Shahrdari Tabriz 

In:

Out:

Tractor Sazi 

In:

Out:

Zob Ahan 

In:

Out:

Azadegan League

Aboomoslem 

In:

Out:

Aluminium Hormozgan 

In:

Out:

Bargh Shiraz 

In:

Out:

Damash Tehran 

In:

Out:

Esteghlal Jonub 

In:

Out:

Etka 

In:

Out:

Foolad Yazd 

In:

Out:

Gahar Zagros 

In:

Out:

Gol Gohar 

In:

Out:

Gostaresh Foolad 

In:

Out:

Hamyari Arak 

In:

Out:

Iranjavan 

In:

Out:

Machine Sazi 

In:

Out:

Mes Rafsanjan 

In:

Out:

Naft Masjed Soleyman 

In:

Out:

Nassaji 

In:

Out:

Nirooye Zamini 

In:

Out:

Pas Hamadan 

In:

Out:

Payam Mashhad 

In:

Out:

Payam Mokhaberat 

In:

Out:

Paykan 

In:

Out:

Saipa Shomal 

In:

Out:

Sanati Kaveh 

In:

Out:

Sanat Sari 

In:

Out:

Shahrdari Bandar Abbas 

In:

Out:

Shahrdari Yasuj 

In:

Out:

Shirin Faraz 

In:

Out:

Steel Azin 

In:

Out:

Tarbiat Yazd 

In:

Out:

Notes and references

transfers
Football transfers winter 2011–12
2011-12